Ralph Engelstad Arena (The Ralph) was a 6,067-seat multi-purpose arena located on the University of North Dakota (UND) campus in Grand Forks, North Dakota. It was home to the University of North Dakota Fighting Sioux hockey team, and was the host of the 1983 Frozen Four tournament.  It was originally named the Winter Sports Center, but was renamed in 1988 to honor alumnus Ralph Engelstad. The arena closed in 2001 and was replaced with the new $104 million Ralph Engelstad Arena on the north end of campus.

University of North Dakota Director of Athletics Brian Faison announced that demolition of the old Ralph Engelstad Arena east of Memorial Stadium has been completed. Construction has begun on Phase I of the UND Athletics High Performance Center, an indoor practice and competition facility for UND Athletics.

Notes

External links

Defunct college ice hockey venues in the United States
Defunct indoor arenas in the United States
Defunct sports venues in North Dakota
North Dakota Fighting Hawks ice hockey venues
Buildings and structures in Grand Forks, North Dakota
1972 establishments in North Dakota
2001 disestablishments in North Dakota
Sports venues demolished in 2013
Sports venues completed in 1972
Demolished sports venues in the United States
Indoor arenas in North Dakota